Presidential elections were held in Iran on 2 October 1981, after the assassination of Mohammad-Ali Rajai, the previous President of Iran, during the interim premiership of Mohammad-Reza Mahdavi Kani. It led to the uncontested victory of Ali Khamenei.

Campaign
Candidates Ali Akbar Parvaresh, Hassan Ghafourifard and Reza Zavare'i publicly endorsed Khamenei for president, stating they will vote for him on television.

Results

References

Presidential elections in Iran
1981 elections in Iran
One-party elections
Iran
Ali Khamenei